The Bandaranaike Memorial International Conference Hall (BMICH), is a convention center located in Colombo, Sri Lanka. Built between 1970 and 1973, the convention centre was a gift from the People's Republic of China in memory of Solomon Ridgeway Dias Bandaranaike, Prime Minister (1956–1959).

The construction of the hall was carried out by a joint Sri Lankan and Chinese workforce with a considerable portion of the building materials being imported from China.

In 1998 a small Exhibition Centre, the Sirimavo Bandaranaike Memorial Exhibition Centre, was built on the grounds as a gift from China.

The BMICH premises is managed by the S. W. R. D. Bandaranaike National Memorial Foundation (BNMF) which is chaired by the President of Sri Lanka.

The BNMF has an academic wing specialised in International Relations, Languages and Cultural Studies named "Bandaranaike Centre for International Studies (BCIS)" located within the BMICH premises.

Facilities

An up-to-date library with volumes of literature on almost all subjects is available for the use of research for delegates visiting the BMICH. To facilitate with banking needs, a bank is located near the main hall. Due to the high-profile events taking place within the venue the Sri Lanka Police maintains a permanent detachment and the Mount Lavinia Hotel has a restaurant. The Sirimavo Bandaranaike Memorial Exhibition Centre has floor area covering 4,500 sq. m. consists of two exhibition halls, lobby, dining room, lounge, kitchen and other VIP amenities.

Events
Several high-profile events and exhibitions have been held in the venue, including the Non-Aligned Movement Summit 16–19 August 1976, Commonwealth Heads of Government Meeting 2013, and the WORLD CONFERENCE ON YOUTH 2014. It is host to the annual EDEX Expo.

Local Events
There have been some local events and exhibitions held in Sirimavo Bandaranaike Memorial Exhibition Centre (SBMEC) such as
BMICH Life Style Shopping Expo (April and December)
Colombo International Book Fair
Colombo Shopping Festival 
Medicare 
Wedding Show
Bridal show
Home & You
Pro Food
Facets Gem
Motor show
Build SL (Housing & construction expo)
Kedella (Architectural and furniture)
Architect

Organisations
Found within the large grounds are several government and private organisations. These include:
Bandaranaike International Diplomatic Training Institute
Bandaranaike Centre for International Studies (BCIS) 
LankaCert - Computer Emergency Response Team of the Sri Lankan Government
National Police Commission
Rakna Arakshaka Lanka Security Ltd.

External links
Official Website 
Conference & Banquet facilities available at the Bandaranaike Memorial International Conference Hall (BMICH)

References 

Convention centres in Sri Lanka
Cultural buildings in Colombo
Government buildings in Sri Lanka